Kix (stylized as KiX) is an American brand of breakfast cereal introduced in 1937 by the General Mills company of Golden Valley, Minnesota. The product is an extruded, expanded puffed-grain cereal made with cornmeal.

Products 

General Mills introduced Berry Berry Kix in 1992 and Honey Kix in 2009. In Original Kix, total sugars are about 10% by weight, which is about 3 grams of sugar per serving. Honey Kix has 6 grams, Berry Berry Kix has 7 grams.

Production 

The grain is processed and expanded: water is added and the corn is pulverized. Kix are cooked in the extruder, when the dough is formed into the desired shape by extrusion through a die. It was the first cereal to be manufactured using this process.

Experimentation with the Kix puffing process led to popular brands like Cheerios (1941).

Promotions 
In 1947, Kix offered a Lone Ranger atomic bomb ring in exchange for a box top and 15 cents. The ring contained a spinthariscope, so that when the red base (which served as a "secret message compartment") was taken off, and after a period of time for dark adaptation, you could look through a small plastic lens at scintillations caused by polonium alpha particles striking a zinc sulfide screen.

Advertising 

The slogan "Kid Tested. Mother Approved." was introduced in 1978. During the 1980s, television commercials included the jingle "Kids love Kix for what Kix has got. Moms love Kix for what Kix has not," the latter a reference to its claims of no added food coloring or flavors.

In 2018, the slogan was updated to "Kid-tested. Parent-approved" in order to avoid imposing traditional parenting roles.

References

External links 

Ingredients and nutrition facts from General Mills 

General Mills cereals
Products introduced in 1937